약 (Revised Romanization: yak) may refer to:
Radical 214 of Chinese characters
Yak, also called tongso yak, one of the types of traditional Korean musical instruments

See also
Hangul Syllables, the Unicode Block containing this character
Yak (disambiguation)